Brian Howe is an American actor. He is best known for his portrayal of stockbroker Jay Twistle in the film The Pursuit of Happyness.

Career
His other films include K-PAX, The Majestic, Catch Me If You Can, RV, Déjà Vu, Return to Me, Evan Almighty, Gran Torino (as Steve Kowalski) and Annabelle. Howe has appeared in guest roles in a number of television series, including Crossing Jordan, Criminal Minds, Judging Amy, The Unit, Without a Trace, Boston Legal, The Shield, Lie to Me, Charmed, and was a regular on Journeyman as the newspaper editor until the cancellation of the show by NBC in December 2007 due to low ratings. More recently, he has had recurring roles on Nikita, Justified and Westworld. In 2021, he had a main role in Kevin Can F**k Himself as Peter McRoberts.

Howe is part of the stock company formed by filmmaker Larry Blamire, and has played Dr. Roger Fleming, the evil scientist who awakens the skeleton, in the 2004 science-fiction spoof The Lost Skeleton of Cadavra, his twin brother Peter Fleming in its sequel, The Lost Skeleton Returns Again, the dim but heroic sailor Big Dan Frater in Trail of the Screaming Forehead, and the foppish Englishman Burling Famish Jr. in Dark and Stormy Night.

Selected filmography

Television

Film

References

External links
 

Year of birth missing (living people)
Living people
American male film actors
American male television actors
People from Barrington, Rhode Island
Place of birth missing (living people)